Yugoslavs in Serbia refers to a community in Serbia that view themselves as Yugoslavs with no other ethnic self-identification. Additionally, there are also Serbs, Croats, Montenegrins, Bosniaks and people of other ethnicities in Serbia who identify themselves as Yugoslavs. However, the latter group does not consider itself to be part of a Yugoslav nation, which is the way the first group identifies itself. People declaring themselves Yugoslavs are concentrated much more prominently in multicultural Vojvodina where roughly half of all Yugoslavs in Serbia are found.

According to the 2011 census, some 23,303 people or 0.32% of the inhabitants of Serbia declared their ethnicity as Yugoslav. Ahead of the 2022 census, a newly formed organization called  (National Movement "Yugoslavs") began encouraging citizens of Serbia to freely self-identificate as Yugoslavs, an initiative joined by an increasing number of public figures. One of them is a radio host , who also announced that work is underway for establishing the National Council of Yugoslavs in Serbia, following the example of other minority communities, for self-identifying Yugoslavs to enjoy equal minority rights.

Demographics

Notable people
 Lepa Brena (born 1960), singer, Bosnian Muslim parentage
 Joška Broz (born 1947), politician, grandson of the former Yugoslav president Josip Broz Tito
 Oliver Dulić (born 1975), politician, of mixed Serb and Bunjevac parentage
 Predrag Ejdus, actor, of mixed Jewish and Serb parentage

See also 
 Yugoslavs
 Yugoslavism

References

External links
 Yugoslav club in Serbia

Ethnic groups in Serbia